Peter Baron was the member of Parliament for Coventry in 1305. He was a city justice.

References 

Members of the Parliament of England for Coventry
14th-century English politicians
English MPs 1305
Year of birth unknown
Year of death unknown